The Ultimate Braai Master is a South African reality cooking competition television series created and hosted by Justin Bonello. The first season premiered on 13 September 2012. The first three seasons aired on SABC 3 before switching to e.tv. As of season 7, the series is also available to stream on Netflix.

The series has won multiple SAFTAs with additional nominations, and 2017 numbers indicated The Ultimate Braai Master was the most popular cooking show in South Africa. Judges have included Bertus Basson, Marthinus Ferreira, Petrus Madutlela, Benny Masekwameng, and Pete Goffe-Wood.

In May 2021, it was announced the series would be returning that September after a break due to COVID-19, having received funding from Nelson Mandela Bay Metropolitan Municipality to film a contained season 7 there.

Premise
Teams of two, consisting of a Braai Master and a Braai Buddy, compete against each other in various braai (barbecue) challenges across 13 episodes in multiple locations. Teams are eliminated along the way and the winning team can win amazing prizes plus you and your other team member will stand the chance to take ownership of the next Ultimate Braai Master title.

Seasons

Awards and nominations

References

External links
 
 The Ultimate Braai Master at TVSA
 

2010s cooking television series
2010s South African television series
2012 South African television series debuts
2020s cooking television series
2020s South African television series
Food reality television series
South African reality television series